Transwisata Prima Aviation is an airline based in Indonesia. It operates charter services. Transwisata Prima Aviation is listed in category 2 by Indonesian Civil Aviation Authority for airline safety quality.

Fleet 
The Transwisata Air fleet consists of the following aircraft (as of September 2020):

In 2007 the Transwisata Prima Aviation fleet included the following aircraft:

5 Fokker 50
2 Fokker 100
1 Fokker F28 Mk4000

References

External links 
Company website

Airlines of Indonesia